Caño Negro Wildlife Refuge is a Wildlife refuge, part of the Arenal Huetar Norte Conservation Area, in the northern part of Costa Rica twenty kilometers south of Los Chiles near the border with Nicaragua in the Alajuela province. The refuge is a wetlands site that is home to many migratory waterfowl during part of the year, centered on Lake Caño Negro which is fed by the Frío River during the rainy season.

Access 
Main access road is Route 138 which connects Route 4 and Route 35.

Facilities
There are no public facilities at the refuge, and the area can be explored only by boat, for which there is a dock as well as tourist facilities at the town of Caño Negro.

Wildlife

The forests, grasslands and marshes of the area provide shelter for various endangered species such as cougars, jaguars, tapirs, ocelots, peccary and several species of monkey (Panamanian white-faced capuchin, mantled howler and Geoffroy's spider monkey), as well as many others. In the dry season the river is reduced to little lagoons, channels and beaches which gives home to thousands of migratory birds of many species such as storks, spoonbills, ibis, anhingas, ducks and cormorants.

References

External links
 Caño Negro Wildlife Refuge at Costa Rica National Parks

Nature reserves in Costa Rica
Biosphere reserves of Costa Rica
Ramsar sites in Costa Rica
Geography of Alajuela Province